The Changan CS15 is a subcompact crossover produced by Changan Automobile positioned under the similar-sized Changan CS35.

Overview
The Changan CS15 debuted on the 2015 Guangzhou Auto Show with prices ranging from 53,900 yuan to 75,400 yuan and the official market launch in March 2016.

The Changan CS15 is powered by a 1.5 liter inline-4 with about 120hp, mated to a six-speed manual transmission or a six-speed automatic transmission.

2019 facelift
The Changan CS15 received a facelift in 2019 with prices ranging from 55,900 yuan to 78,900 yuan and the official market launch in March 2019. The post-facelift model was also sold as Changan CS15 in egypt, and named Changan CS15 Plus and Changan CS35 Mini in China and Changan CS15 Pro in export markets.

CS15EV
The Changan CS15EV is an electric car based on the Changan CS15 subcompact CUV. Power of the Changan CS15EV comes from an electric motor producing 75hp and 170nm of torque, setting a 110 km/h top speed and a range of 300 kilometers. According to the official website, the prices of the Changan CS15EV ranges from 189,400 yuan to 196,400 yuan.

Changan CS15 E-Pro
The Changan CS15 E-Pro was revealed at the 2019 World Intelligent Network Automotive Conference and the 7th China International New Energy and Intelligent Networking Automotive Exhibition (IEEVChina 2019). It is essentially the facelift of the Changan CS15EV with performance improvements included. The CS15 E-Pro is powered by an E-motor with maximum power of 120kW (160hp). The power battery capacity is 48.3 kWh. The Changan CS15 E-Pro was officially listed for sale in November 2019.

Oshan COS3°
The Oshan COS3°, pronounced as Oshan Kesai 3, is a rebadged variant of the Changan CS15 Plus sold under the Oshan brand. In addition to the redesign of the front face, the Oshan COS3° is basically identical to the Changan CS15 Plus. The COS3° is equipped with the same powertrain as Changan CS15, which is a 1.5 liter naturally aspirated engine with a maximum power of 78.5kW (105hp), mated to a DCT and manual gearbox from the same power combination on the Changan CS15.

References

External links

  (CS15)
  (CS15EV)

Cars introduced in 2015
Cars of China
CS15
Crossover sport utility vehicles
Front-wheel-drive vehicles
Mini sport utility vehicles
Production electric cars